Glindon is a surname. Notable people with the surname include: 

Mary Glindon (born 1957), British politician
Robert Glindon ( 1799–1866), British singer, songwriter, and scene painter